Claude Birraux (born 18 January 1946 in Ambilly, Haute-Savoie) is a member of the National Assembly of France.  He represents the Haute-Savoie department, and is a member of the Union for a Popular Movement.

References

1946 births
Living people
People from Haute-Savoie
Union for French Democracy politicians
Union for a Popular Movement politicians
Deputies of the 12th National Assembly of the French Fifth Republic
Deputies of the 13th National Assembly of the French Fifth Republic